In mathematics, the Lichnerowicz conjecture is a generalization of a conjecture introduced by . The Lichnerowicz conjecture usually refers to the generalization that locally harmonic manifolds are flat or rank-1 locally symmetric. It has been proven true for compact manifolds with fundamental groups that are finite groups  but counterexamples exist in seven or more dimensions in the non-compact case

References

Riemannian geometry